Olivibacter jilunii is a Gram-negative, aerobic, non-spore-forming and non-motile bacterium from the genus of Olivibacter which has been isolated from DDT-contaminated soil in China.

References

External links
Type strain of Olivibacter jilunii at BacDive -  the Bacterial Diversity Metadatabase

Sphingobacteriia
Bacteria described in 2013